James Lawrence (born 1785) was an English first-class cricketer who played for the Cambridge Town Club in the 1820s. He is recorded in two matches in 1820, totalling 14 runs with a highest score of 11.

References

Bibliography
 

English cricketers
English cricketers of 1787 to 1825
Cambridge Town Club cricketers
1785 births
Year of death unknown